Hadland is a surname. Notable people with the surname include:

Phil Hadland (born 1980), English footballer and manager
Sarah Hadland (born 1971), English actress
Scott Hadland (born 1981), American physician and scientist

See also
Haaland
Harland (name)